Maxime Grousset (born 24 April 1999) is a French swimmer. He is a world record holder in the short course 4×50 metre mixed freestyle relay. He won the silver medal in the 100 metre freestyle and the bronze medal in the 50 metre freestyle at the 2022 World Aquatics Championships (long course) as well as the silver medal in the 100 metre freestyle at the 2022 World Short Course Championships. At the 2022 European Aquatics Championships (long course), he won the silver medal in the 50 metre butterfly.

Career

2017–2018
At the 2017 European Junior Swimming Championships in June and July, Grousset won bronze medals in the 50 metre freestyle, with a 22.59, and the 50 metre butterfly, with a 23.88, and placed seventh in the 100 metre freestyle with a 49.85 and fourth in the 4×100 metre medley relay, where he contributed to a final time of 3:41.67. The following month, at the 2017 World Junior Swimming Championships, he won the silver medal in the 50 metre freestyle with a time of 22.25 seconds, placed seventh in the 100 metre freestyle with a 49.95 and sixth in the 4×100 metre medley relay with a 3:41.89. He competed in the 4×100 metre mixed freestyle relay event at the 2018 European Aquatics Championships, winning the gold medal.

2019–2021
At the 2019 World Aquatics Championships in Gwangju, South Korea, Grousset won a bronze medal in the 4×100 metre mixed freestyle relay, contributing a 48.61 for the second leg of the relay in the preliminaries before being substituted out and Medhy Metella substituted in for the final. Later in the year, he won a bronze medal in the 4×50 metre mixed freestyle relay at the 2019 European Short Course Championships, held in December in Glasgow, Scotland, leading off with a 21.35 to contribute to a finish in a French record time of 1:28.86. In 2021, at the 2020 Summer Olympics in Tokyo, Japan, he placed fourth in the 100 metre freestyle, with a time of 47.72 seconds, behind Caeleb Dressel of the United States, Kyle Chalmers of Australia, and Kliment Kolesnikov of Russia.

2021 World Short Course Championships
The second day of the 2021 World Short Course Championships in December in Abu Dhabi, United Arab Emirates, Grousset placed sixth in the 4×50 metre mixed freestyle relay, swimming a 21.17 for the lead-off leg of the relay to contribute to a final time of 1:30.06. On the morning of day four, he placed seventeenth in the preliminaries of the 50 metre butterfly with a time of 22.94 seconds, not advancing to the evening semifinals. In the evening, he placed sixth in the final of the 50 metre freestyle, finishing in a time of 21.08 seconds. Two days later, he started the evening finals session off with a fifth-place finish in the 100 metre freestyle in a time of 46.20 seconds. He concluded the day, and the Championships, with a relay team disqualification in the final of the 4×100 metre medley relay, with the disqualification due to a negative reaction time for the start by the breaststroke swimmer.

2022

2022 World Championships
At the 2022 World Aquatics Championships, contested at Danube Arena in Budapest, Hungary, Grousset won the silver medal in the 100 metre freestyle, finishing with a time of 47.64 seconds, which was 0.06 seconds behind gold medalist David Popovici of Romania. He also won the bronze medal in the 50 metre freestyle with a time of 21.57 seconds, finishing 0.25 seconds behind gold medalist Ben Proud of Great Britain and 0.16 seconds behind silver medalist Michael Andrew of the United States.

2022 European Championships
Grousset started competition on day one of the 2022 European Aquatics Championships, held in Rome, Italy, ranking second in the preliminaries of the 50 metre butterfly with a time of 23.20 seconds and advancing to the semifinals. In the semifinals, he ranked second across both heats, qualifying for the final with a personal best time of 22.90 seconds. Day two of competition, in the morning preliminaries of the 100 metre freestyle, he ranked fourth and qualified for the evening semifinals with a time of 48.31 seconds. In the evening session, he won the silver medal in the 50 metre butterfly with a time of 22.97 seconds, 0.08 seconds behind gold medalist Thomas Ceccon of Italy. Later in the session, he lowered his time to a 48.15 for the semifinals of the 100 metre freestyle and qualified for the final ranking fifth. In the final of the 100 metre freestyle the following day, he placed fourth with a time of 47.78 seconds, finishing 0.15 seconds behind bronze medalist Alessandro Miressi of Italy.

On the fourth day, Grousset led-off the 4×100 metre freestyle relay in the final with a 47.69 before the relay was disqualified for an early start by the second swimmer. The next day, he swam the lead-off leg of the 4×100 metre mixed freestyle relay, contributing a 48.02 to the final mark of 3:22.80 to win the gold medal. For the preliminaries of the 50 metre freestyle in the morning on day six, he tied Diogo Ribeiro of Portugal for fourteenth rank with a time of 22.23 seconds and qualified for the semifinals. In the evening semifinals, he brought his time down to a 21.75, ranking fifth overall and qualifying for the final. The seventh day, he placed fifth in the final of the 50 metre freestyle with a time of 21.87 seconds. Later in the session, he won a silver medal as part of the 4×100 metre medley relay, anchoring the relay to a finish in 3:32.50 with a split time of 47.43 seconds.

2022 Swimming World Cup
In the 100 metre freestyle at the 2022 FINA Swimming World Cup stop held in Berlin, Germany, Grousset won the silver medal with a time of 46.38 seconds, finishing 0.50 seconds behind gold medalist Kyle Chalmers. For his other events, he placed sixth in the 50 metre freestyle with a time of 21.31 seconds and ninth in the 50 metre butterfly with a time of 22.98 seconds.

2022 World Short Course Championships
Achieving a personal best time of 45.77 seconds in the preliminaries of the 100 metre freestyle on day two of the 2022 World Short Course Championships, held in December in Melbourne, Australia, Grousset qualified for the semifinals ranking second overall. In the evening semifinals, he lowered his personal best time to a 45.58 and qualified for the final ranking second. The morning of day three, he ranked first across all preliminary heats in the 100 metre individual medley with a time of 51.94 seconds and advanced to the semifinals. Finishing in a personal best time of 45.41 seconds in the evening final of the 100 metre freestyle, he won the silver medal. He was subsequently disqualified in the semifinals of the 100 metre individual medley in the same session.

The morning of day four, Grousset split a 20.76 for the second leg of the 4×50 metre mixed freestyle relay to help advance the relay with a time of 1:29.69 to the final ranking first. Then he tied in rank for tenth in the preliminaries of the 50 metre freestyle with a time of 21.13 seconds and advanced to the semifinals. In the evening session, he led-off the finals relay with a 20.92 to contribute to a new world record time of 1:27.33 and winning the gold medal. Approximately 65 minutes later, he ranked eighth in the semifinals of the 50 metre freestyle with a personal best time of 20.97 seconds and qualified for the final. The following morning, he split a 22.18 for the butterfly leg of the 4×50 metre medley relay, helping qualify for the final ranking second with a 1:32.53. On the finals relay, he lowered his time to a 21.90, helping achieve a fifth-place finish in a time of 1:31.41. Later in the session, he placed fifth in the final of the 50 metre freestyle, finishing in a personal best time of 20.90 seconds. On the sixth, and final, day, he achieved a personal best time of 1:41.79 in the preliminaries of the 200 metre freestyle to qualify for the evening final ranking third. Improving his personal best mark to a 1:41.56 in the final, he placed sixth.

International championships (50 m)

 Grousset swam only in the preliminaries.

International championships (25 m)

Personal best times

Long course metres (50 m pool)

Legend: sf – semifinal; r – relay 1st leg

Short course metres (25 m pool)

Swimming World Cup circuits
The following medals Grousset has won at Swimming World Cup circuits.

World records

Short course metres (25 m pool)

References

External links

1999 births
Living people
People from Nouméa
French male butterfly swimmers
French male freestyle swimmers
World Aquatics Championships medalists in swimming
Medalists at the FINA World Swimming Championships (25 m)
European Aquatics Championships medalists in swimming
Swimmers at the 2020 Summer Olympics
Olympic swimmers of France
21st-century French people
New Caledonian male swimmers